Chris Warren may refer to:

Chris Warren (American football) (born 1967), American football running back
 Chris Warren III (born 1996), his son, American football running back
Chris Warren (basketball, born 1981), American basketball player
Chris Warren (basketball, born 1988), American basketball player for AEK Athens
Chris Warren (musician) (1967–2016), American musician
Chris Warren (rugby league) (born 1970), Australian rugby league footballer and commentator
Chris Warren (actor) (born 1990), American actor
Christer Warren (born 1974), English footballer
Christopher Warren, Member of Parliament (MP) for Coventry

See also
Christopher Warren-Green (born 1955), conductor